The National Statuary Hall is a chamber in the United States Capitol devoted to sculptures of prominent Americans. The hall, also known as the Old Hall of the House, is a large, two-story, semicircular room with a second story gallery along the curved perimeter. It is located immediately south of the Rotunda. The meeting place of the U.S. House of Representatives for nearly 50 years (1807–1857), after a few years of disuse in 1864 it was repurposed as a statuary hall; this is when the National Statuary Hall Collection was established. By 1933, the collection had outgrown this single room, and a number of statues are placed elsewhere within the Capitol.

Description
The Hall is built in the shape of an ancient amphitheater and is one of the earliest examples of Neoclassical architecture in America. While most wall surfaces are painted plaster, the low gallery walls and pilasters are sandstone. Around the room's perimeter stand colossal columns of variegated breccia marble quarried along the Potomac River. The Corinthian capitals of white marble were carved in Carrara, Italy. A lantern in the fireproof cast-steel ceiling admits natural light into the Hall. The chamber floor is laid with black and white marble tiles; the black marble was purchased specifically for the chamber, while the white marble was scrap material from the Capitol extension project.

Only two of the many statues presently in the room were commissioned for display in the original Hall of the House. Enrico Causici's neoclassical plaster Liberty and the Eagle looks out over the Hall from a niche above the colonnade behind what was once the Speaker's rostrum. The sandstone relief eagle in the frieze of the entablature below was carved by Giuseppe Valaperta. Above the door leading into the Rotunda is the Car of History by Carlo Franzoni. This neoclassical marble sculpture depicts Clio, the Muse of History, riding in the chariot of Time and recording events in the chamber below. The wheel of the chariot contains the chamber clock; the works are by Simon Willard.

History
This chamber is the second hall and third meeting place built for the House of Representatives in this location. Prior to this, the House members met in a squat, oval, temporary building known as "the Oven", which had been hastily erected in 1801. The first permanent Hall, designed by Benjamin Henry Latrobe, was completed in 1807; however, it was destroyed when invading British troops burned the Capitol in August 1814 during the War of 1812. The Hall was rebuilt in its present form by Latrobe and his successor, Charles Bulfinch, between 1815 and 1819. The smooth, curved ceiling promoted annoying echoes, making it difficult to conduct business. Various attempts to improve the acoustics, including hanging draperies and reversing the seating arrangement, proved unsuccessful. The only solution to this problem was to build an entirely new Hall, one in which debates could be easily understood. In 1850, a new Hall was authorized, and the House moved into its present chamber in the new House wing in 1857.

Many important events took place in this Chamber while it served as the Hall of the House. It was in this room in 1824 that the Marquis de Lafayette became the first foreign citizen to address Congress. Presidents James Madison, James Monroe, John Quincy Adams, Andrew Jackson, and Millard Fillmore were inaugurated here. John Quincy Adams, in particular, has long been associated with the Chamber. It was here in 1825 that he was elected president by the House of Representatives, none of the candidates having secured a majority of electoral votes. Following his presidency, Adams served as a Member in the Hall for 17 years. He collapsed at his desk from a stroke on February 21, 1848, and died two days later in the adjoining office, at the time, of the Speaker of the House.

The fate of the vacated Hall remained uncertain for many years, although various proposals were put forth for its use. Perhaps the simplest was that it be converted into additional space for the Library of Congress, which was still housed in the Capitol. More drastic was the suggestion that the entire Hall be dismantled and replaced by two floors of committee rooms. Eventually, the idea of using the chamber as an art gallery was approved, and works intended for the Capitol extensions were put on exhibit; among these was the plaster model for the Statue of Freedom, which was later cast in bronze for the Capitol dome. The lack of wall space effectively prevented the hanging of large paintings, but the room seemed well suited to the display of statuary.

In 1864, in accordance with legislation sponsored by Representative Justin Morrill, Congress invited each state to contribute two statues of prominent citizens for permanent display in the room, which was renamed National Statuary Hall. The legislation also provided for the replacement of the chamber's floor, which was leveled and covered with the marble tile currently in the Hall. This modification, along with the replacement of the original wooden ceiling (which was painted to simulate three-dimensional coffering) with the present one in the early 20th century, eliminated most of the echoes that earlier plagued the room.

The first statue was placed in 1870. By 1971, all 50 states had contributed at least one statue, and by 1990, all but five states had contributed two statues. Initially all of the state statues were placed in the Hall. As the collection expanded, however, it outgrew the Hall, and in 1933, Congress authorized the display of the statues throughout the building for both aesthetic and structural reasons. Presently, 38 statues are located in National Statuary Hall.

The room was partially restored in 1976 for the bicentennial celebration. At that time, the original fireplaces were uncovered and replicas of early mantels were installed. Reproductions of the chandelier, sconces, and red draperies were created for the restoration project based on The House of Representatives, an oil painting by Samuel F.B. Morse done in 1822, which now hangs in the Corcoran Gallery of Art. Bronze markers were placed on the floor to honor the presidents who served in the House of Representatives while it met here.

In 2008, 23 statues were moved from the hall to the new Capitol Visitor Center.

Three people have lain in state in the National Statuary Hall:
 Elijah Cummings (October 24, 2019)
 Ruth Bader Ginsburg (September 25, 2020)
 Don Young (March 29, 2022)

On January 6, 2021, pro-Trump protesters opposing the victory of President-elect Joe Biden in the 2020 election entered the U.S. Capitol during the Congressional certification of the vote count, and gained access to the National Statuary Hall.

Today, Statuary Hall is one of the most visited rooms in the Capitol. It is visited by hundreds of tourists each day and continues to be used for ceremonial occasions. Special events held in the room include activities honoring foreign dignitaries and every four years Congress hosts a newly inaugurated President of the United States for a luncheon.

Statues

The following is an alphabetical list of the people depicted in the statues, along with the state represented by each statue. Note that some statues have been replaced at the request of the states over time.

Samuel Adams, Massachusetts
Ethan Allen, Vermont
Stephen F. Austin, Texas
Charles Brantley Aycock, North Carolina (to be replaced by Billy Graham)
Edward L. Bartlett, Alaska
William Henry Harrison Beadle, South Dakota
Mary McLeod Bethune, Florida
Francis Preston Blair, Jr., Missouri
William Borah, Idaho
Norman Borlaug, Iowa
John Burke, North Dakota
John C. Calhoun, South Carolina
Charles Carroll, Maryland
Lewis Cass, Michigan
Dennis Chavez, New Mexico
James Paul Clarke, Arkansas (to be replaced by Daisy Lee Gatson Bates or Johnny Cash)
Henry Clay, Kentucky
John M. Clayton, Delaware
George Clinton, New York
Jacob Collamer, Vermont
Father Damien, Hawaii
Jefferson Davis, Mississippi
Amelia Earhart, Kansas
Thomas Edison, Ohio
Dwight D. Eisenhower, Kansas
Philo T. Farnsworth, Utah (to be replaced by Martha Hughes Cannon)
Gerald Ford, Michigan
Robert Fulton, Pennsylvania
James A. Garfield, Ohio
James Zachariah George, Mississippi
Barry Goldwater, Arizona
John Gorrie, Florida
Nathanael Greene, Rhode Island
Ernest Gruening, Alaska
Hannibal Hamlin, Maine
Wade Hampton III, South Carolina
John Hanson, Maryland
Samuel Houston, Texas
Andrew Jackson, Tennessee
Mother Joseph, Washington
Kamehameha I, Hawaii
Philip Kearny, New Jersey
Helen Keller, Alabama
John E. Kenna, West Virginia
William King, Maine
Fr. Eusebio Kino, Arizona
Samuel Jordan Kirkwood, Iowa
Robert M. La Follette, Sr., Wisconsin
Jason Lee, Oregon
Robert R. Livingston, New York
Crawford W. Long, Georgia
Huey P. Long, Louisiana
Fr. Jacques Marquette, Wisconsin
Patrick Anthony McCarran, Nevada
Ephraim McDowell, Kentucky
John McLoughlin, Oregon
Esther Hobart Morris, Wyoming
Julius Sterling Morton, Nebraska (to be replaced by Willa Cather)
Oliver Hazard Perry Morton, Indiana
John Peter Gabriel Muhlenberg, Pennsylvania
Rosa Parks, not representing any state
Francis Harrison Pierpont, West Virginia
Po'pay, New Mexico
Jeannette Rankin, Montana
Ronald Reagan, California
Henry Mower Rice, Minnesota
Caesar Rodney, Delaware
Will Rogers, Oklahoma
Uriah Milton Rose, Arkansas (to be replaced by Daisy Lee Gatson Bates or Johnny Cash)
Charles Marion Russell, Montana
Florence R. Sabin, Colorado
Sacagawea, North Dakota
Maria Sanford, Minnesota
Sequoyah, Oklahoma
Junipero Serra, California
John Sevier, Tennessee
Roger Sherman, Connecticut
James Shields, Illinois
George Laird Shoup, Idaho
Standing Bear, Nebraska
John Stark, New Hampshire
Alexander H. Stephens, Georgia
Richard Stockton, New Jersey
John L. Swigert, Colorado
Jonathan Trumbull, Connecticut
Harry S. Truman, Missouri
Zebulon B. Vance, North Carolina
Lewis Wallace, Indiana
Joseph Ward, South Dakota
Washakie, Wyoming
George Washington, Virginia
Daniel Webster, New Hampshire
Joseph Wheeler, Alabama
Edward Douglass White, Louisiana
Marcus Whitman, Washington (to be replaced by Billy Frank Jr.)
Frances E. Willard, Illinois
Roger Williams, Rhode Island
Sarah Winnemucca, Nevada
John Winthrop, Massachusetts
Brigham Young, Utah

Replaced statues
George Washington Glick, Kansas (removed in favor of Dwight D. Eisenhower in 2003)
Thomas Starr King, California (removed in favor of Ronald Reagan in 2009)
Jabez Lamar Monroe Curry, Alabama (removed in favor of Helen Keller in 2009); see Statue of Jabez Lamar Monroe Curry
Zachariah Chandler, Michigan (removed in favor of Gerald R. Ford in 2011)
James Harlan, Iowa (removed in favor of Norman Borlaug in 2014)
John James Ingalls, Kansas (removed in favor of Amelia Earhart in 2022)
William Jennings Bryan, Nebraska (removed in favor of Chief Standing Bear in 2019)
John Campbell Greenway, Arizona (removed in favor of Barry M. Goldwater in 2015)
William Allen, Ohio (removed in favor of Thomas A. Edison in 2016); see Statue of William Allen
Robert E. Lee, Virginia (removed in 2020, to be replaced later by Barbara Rose Johns)
Thomas Hart Benton, Missouri (removed in favor of Harry S. Truman in 2022)
Edmund Kirby Smith, Florida (removed in favor of Mary McLeod Bethune in 2022)

Statues to be replaced in the future
Charles Brantley Aycock, North Carolina (to be replaced by Billy Graham, decided in 2018)
Julius Sterling Morton, Nebraska (to be replaced by Willa Cather, decided in 2018)
Philo T. Farnsworth, Utah (to be replaced by Martha Hughes Cannon, decided in 2019)
Uriah Milton Rose and James Paul Clarke, Arkansas (to be replaced by Johnny Cash and Daisy Lee Gatson Bates, decided in 2019)
Marcus Whitman, Washington (to be replaced by Billy Frank Jr., decided in 2021)

See also
Hall of Fame for Great Americans
National Garden of American Heroes

References

External links
U.S. Capitol website: National Statuary Hall

United States Capitol rooms
Benjamin Henry Latrobe buildings and structures